Fadi Frem (born 1953 in Achrafieh, Beirut, Lebanon) is the former leader of the Lebanese Forces Christian militia and political party. He is married to Lena Abou Nader, the grand daughter of Pierre Gemayel. He holds a degree in mechanical engineering from the American University of Beirut, Masters in Industrial Engineering from Texas A & M, and an MBA from Harvard Business School.

He started his military service in 1969 following incidents which he fought against the Palestinian Liberation Organization (PLO) in Lebanon. He was one of the founding members of the BG Unit and fought against the PLO again in 1975. In 1978, he was appointed into the military intelligence. On September 13, 1982, one day before Lebanese Forces leader and former Lebanese President Bashir Gemayel was killed, Fadi was appointed leader of the Lebanese Forces. He stayed leader of the Lebanese Forces until the election of Fouad Abou Nader.

References

1953 births
American University of Beirut alumni
Texas A&M University alumni
Harvard Business School alumni
People of the Lebanese Civil War
Living people
Lebanese Forces politicians